Suproclone is a sedative and anxiolytic drug in the cyclopyrrolone family of drugs, developed by the French pharmaceutical company Rhône-Poulenc. Other cyclopyrrolone drugs include zopiclone, pagoclone and suriclone. 

Suproclone is very similar in structure to the related drug suriclone, but little information has been published about it specifically. However it can be expected that the mechanism of action by which suproclone produces its sedative and anxiolytic effects is by modulating benzodiazepine receptors (resulting in an increased response to endogenous GABA), in a similar manner to other drugs of this class.

References

Carbamates
Chloroarenes
Cyclopyrrolones
GABAA receptor positive allosteric modulators
Lactams
Naphthyridines
Sedatives
Dithianes
Piperazines
Nitrogen heterocycles
Heterocyclic compounds with 2 rings